Rosebury is a surname. Notable people with the surname include:

 Brett Rosebury (born 1980), Australian rules football field umpire
 Fred Rosebury (1901–1999), American engineer
 Theodor Rosebury (1904–1976), American bacteriologist

See also
 Rosebery (disambiguation)